Rudolf Brunngraber (1901, Vienna - 1960) was an Austrian writer, journalist and painter who worked with Otto Neurath. His novels were translated into eighteen languages, with more than a million books sold.

Brunngraber's novel Radium was adapted for radio by Günter Eich in 1937.

Works
 Karl und das 20. Jahrhundert. Roman, Frankfurt am Main: Societäts-Verlag, 1933. Translated by Eden and Cedar Paul as Karl and the twentieth century, 1933
 Radium; Roman eines Elements, Rowohlt, 1936. Translated by Eden and Cedar Paul as Radium; a novel, 1936.
 Die Engel in Atlantis, 1938.
 Opiumkrieg, roman, 1939.
 Zucker aus Cuba, roman eines goldrausches, 1941.
 Prozess auf Tod und Leben, 1948
 Heroin, 1951

References

External links
 

1901 births
1960 deaths
20th-century Austrian novelists
Austrian male novelists
Journalists from Vienna
20th-century Austrian painters
Austrian male painters
20th-century Austrian male writers
20th-century Austrian male artists